Adja may refer to:

 Aja people of west Africa, mainly residents of Benin
 Abbreviation of Adjassou-Linguetor, a loa in the religion of West African Vodun